Robert de Vere may refer to:

Robert de Vere, 3rd Earl of Oxford (1165–1221)
Robert de Vere, 5th Earl of Oxford (1220–1296)
Robert de Vere, 6th Earl of Oxford (1257–1331)
Robert de Vere, Duke of Ireland, 9th Earl of Oxford (1362–1392)
Robert de Vere, 19th Earl of Oxford (1575–1632)
Robert Vere (died 1461)